Dave's Picks Volume 44 is a three-CD live album by the rock band the Grateful Dead. It contains the complete concert recorded at Autzen Stadium in Eugene, Oregon on June 23, 1990. Also included is a performance of "Cold Rain and Snow" from the band's December 26, 1969 concert, which was cut from the previous Dave's Picks release due to lack of space.  It was released on October 28, 2022, in a limited edition of 25,000 copies.

This concert was the first of a two-night stand in Eugene.  The opening act for both shows was Little Feat.

Critical reception

On AllMusic, Timothy Monger said, "From an archival standpoint, it's notable for a number of reasons. A rare day show with gates opening at noon, there's a loose and lazy feel to this nearly three-hour concert – one of the longest of any era – which features some sterling contributions from keyboardist/singer Brent Mydland..."

Track listing

Disc 1

First set:
 "Feel Like a Stranger" (Bob Weir, John Perry Barlow) – 9:06
 "West L.A. Fadeaway" (Jerry Garcia, Robert Hunter) – 8:38
 "Me and My Uncle" (John Phillips) – 2:22 →
 "Cumberland Blues" (Garcia, Phil Lesh, Hunter) – 6:41
 "Far from Me" (Brent Mydland) – 5:30
 "They Love Each Other" (Garcia, Hunter) – 7:43
 "Cassidy" (Weir, Barlow) – 7:05
 "Tennessee Jed" (Garcia, Hunter) – 8:20 →
 "Promised Land" (Chuck Berry) – 5:06

Disc 2

Second set:
 "Eyes of the World" (Garcia, Hunter) – 15:35 →
 "Looks Like Rain" (Weir, Barlow) – 8:54 →
 "Crazy Fingers" (Garcia, Hunter) – 8:23 →
 "Playing in the Band" (Weir, Mickey Hart, Hunter) – 10:56 →
 "Uncle John's Band" (Garcia, Hunter) – 9:21 →
 "Playing in the Band" (Weir, Hart, Hunter) – 2:21 →
 "Drums" (Hart, Bill Kreutzmann) – 8:24 →

Disc 3

Second set, continued:
 "Space" (Garcia, Lesh, Weir) – 9:47 →
 "The Wheel" (Garcia, Kreutzmann, Hunter) – 5:46 →
 "I Need a Miracle" (Weir, Barlow) – 5:25 →
 "Morning Dew" (Bonnie Dobson, Tim Rose) – 12:06
Encore:
 "One More Saturday Night" (Weir) – 6:13
December 26, 1969 – McFarlin Auditorium, Dallas, TX:
 "Cold Rain and Snow" (traditional, arranged by Grateful Dead) – 5:14

Personnel

Grateful Dead
Jerry Garcia – lead guitar, vocals
Bob Weir – rhythm guitar, vocals
Phil Lesh – bass, vocals
Bill Kreutzmann – drums, percussion
Mickey Hart – drums, percussion
Brent Mydland – keyboards, vocals

Production
Produced by Grateful Dead
Produced for release by David Lemieux
Mastering: Jeffrey Norman
Recording: Dan Healy
Art direction, design: Steve Vance
Cover art: Matt J. Adams
Photos: Robbi Cohn
Additional recording, liner notes essay: David Lemieux

Charts

References

44
Rhino Records live albums
2022 live albums